Royal warrants of appointment have been issued since the 15th century to those who supply goods or services to a royal court or certain royal personages. The warrant enables the supplier to advertise the fact that they supply to the royal family, thereby lending prestige to the brand and/or supplier. In the United Kingdom, grants are currently made by the two most senior members of the British royal family to companies or tradespeople who supply goods and services to individuals in the family.

Suppliers continue to charge for their goods and services – a royal warrant of appointment does not imply that they provide goods and services free of charge. The warrant is typically advertised on billboards or company hoardings in British English, letter-heads and products by displaying the coat of arms or the heraldic badge of the royal personage as appropriate. Underneath the coat of arms will usually appear the phrase "By Appointment to..." followed by the title and name of the royal customer, and then what goods are provided. No other details of what is supplied may be given.

History 

The granting of royal patronage or royal charter was practised across Europe from the early Medieval period. Initially, however, royal patronage was mainly granted to those working in the arts.  Royal charters began to replace royal patronage in around the 12th century. The earliest charters were granted to the trade guilds, with the first recorded British royal charter being granted to the Weavers' Company in 1155 by Henry II of England.

By the 15th century, the royal warrant of appointment replaced the royal charter in England, providing a more formalised system of recognition. Under a royal warrant, the Lord Chamberlain appointed tradespeople as suppliers to the royal household. The printer William Caxton was one of the first recipients of a royal warrant when he became the king's printer in 1476. One of the early monarchs to grant a warrant was King Charles II of England.

A royal warrant sent a strong public signal that the holder supplied goods of a quality acceptable for use in the royal household, and by inference, inspired the confidence of the general public. At a time when product quality was a public issue, a royal warrant imbued suppliers with an independent sign of value. By the 18th century, mass market manufacturers such as Josiah Wedgwood and Matthew Boulton, recognised the value of supplying royalty, often at prices well below cost, for the sake of the publicity and kudos it generated. Royal warrants became keenly sought after and manufacturers began actively displaying the royal arms on their premises, packaging and labelling. By 1840, the rules surrounding the display of royal arms were tightened to prevent fraudulent claims. By the early 19th century, during the reign of Queen Victoria, the number of royal warrants granted rose rapidly with the granting of 2,000 warrants. Since 1885, an annual list of warrant holders has been published in The London Gazette.

Food and drink manufacturers have been some of the most important warrant holder suppliers to the palace. High-profile food and beverage suppliers with a royal warrant include Cadbury; Twinings of London; Bollinger; Fortnum & Mason; Heinz; Tanqueray Gordon & Co and Schweppes.

Non-food suppliers with royal warrants include: Aston Martin; Land Rover; Jaguar cars; Boots; Axminster Carpets; Paragon China; The Irish Linen Company and Yardley of London.

Organisation 

Warrants are currently granted by the King and the Prince of Wales.

Warrants issued by the Queen Elizabeth The Queen Mother automatically expired no later than 2007, five years after her death.

Upon the death of Prince Philip, Duke of Edinburgh in April 2021, warrants issued in his name became void; however warrant holders were permitted to continue to use the Royal Arms and the legend for up to two years. The same occurred upon the death of Queen Elizabeth II in September 2022.

Royal warrants are only awarded to tradesmen, such as carpenters, engravers, cabinet makers, dry-cleaners, even chimney sweeps. Some are well-known companies; many are not. The professions, employment agencies, party planners, the media, government departments, and "places of refreshment or entertainment" (such as pubs and theatres) do not qualify. Today, some 850 individuals and companies, including a few non-UK companies, hold more than 1,100 warrants to the British Royal Family.

The royal warrant signifies there is a satisfactory trade relation in place between the grantor and the company and that the goods nominated are suitable for supply to the royal household. Within the company, there is a nominated person called the grantee. That person is in all respects responsible for all aspects of the royal warrant.

It takes at least five years of supplying goods or services to the member of the royal family before a company is eligible to have its application considered for recommendation. That application is then presented to the royal household and goes to the buyer who makes its recommendation for inclusion. It then goes in front of the Royal Household Warrants Committee, which is chaired by the Lord Chamberlain, which decides whether to accept the recommendation. It then goes to the grantor, who personally signs it. The grantor is empowered to reverse the committee's decision, and therefore the final decision to accept or withhold a grant is a very personal one.

Some royal warrants have been held for more than a hundred years. Goods need not be for the use of the grantor. For example, cigarettes were only bought for the use of guests of the Royal Family, but these warrants were cancelled in 1999 as a matter of public policy.

For business, the granting of a royal warrant is a huge boost, because royal approval may be displayed in public with the coat of royal arms of the grantor, implying that their services or products are of high quality.

Most warrant holders are members of the Royal Warrant Holders Association, which liaises closely with the palace.

Gallery 

Examples of royal warrants in use:

See also

Royal warrant of appointment, warrant to tradespeople who supply goods or services to a royal court
Royal charter, a formal document issued by a monarch to establish an organization
Brand management

References

Bibliography

Further reading

External links 

 Royal Warrants at the Royal Family website
 The Royal Warrant Holders Association

 

de:Hoflieferant